Not So Friendly Neighborhood Affair is a 2021 Bosnian comedy film directed by Danis Tanović, who co-wrote the screenplay with Nikola Kuprešanin. The film stars Branko Đurić and Izudin Bajrović.

Plot
In a COVID-19 pandemic-stricken Sarajevo, people walk with masks on their faces, get sick every day and cafes suffer the consequences of a locked world. There is less and less work, and in the spring of 2021, Baščaršija, Sarajevo's old bazaar, is trying to recover from closed shops. Although the pandemic continues, and the economy is on the wane, Zagreb-based gastro vlogger Gordana (Anja Matković) comes to Baščaršija to eat the best ćevapi (as she says "ćevose"). Enes (Branko Đurić) sends her to Izo (Izudin Bajrović), in order to make him happy for a moment and treat him to his first morning coffee in a good mood.

However, as the road to Jahannam is paved with good intentions, a friendly gesture causes a collapse of business and private life. Two ćevapi makers are in conflict over the quality of ćevapi in their shops, and their children, who are in a love affair, suffer a conflict between their fathers and have a desire to leave Bosnia and Herzegovina. The disagreements of Enes and Izo cause chaos throughout the city, where not everyone is ready to accept the inevitable changes that come with challenging times.

Because of the influencer's comment, everyone is looking for an answer to the question of where to eat the best ćevapi in Sarajevo, with social networks and other digital platforms creating "hype" among people. Enes is sinking deeper and deeper into his business ruin, so much so that he will reach for the services of loan sharks.

Cast
Branko Đurić as Enes
Izudin Bajrović as Izo
Edib Ahmetašević as Meho
Helena Vuković as Lana
Kerim Čutuna as Orhan
Anja Matković as Gordana
Goran Navojec as Cafe Owner
Vedran Tuce as Para
Mediha Musliović as wife of Enes
Ermin Sijamija as Braco
Mirvad Kurić
Nermin Tulić
Halid Bešlić as himself
Goran Bregović as himself

Production
Filming lasted 21 days and began on 5 May 2021. Danis Tanović was once again collaborating with actors Branko Đurić and Izudin Bajrović, after his films No Man's Land (2001) and Death in Sarajevo (2016). Young actors from the Academy of Performing Arts in Sarajevo, Kerim Čutuna and Helena Vuković, also appear in the film.

Release
The film had its premiere at the Sarajevo Film Festival on 13 August 2021.

References

External links

2021 films
2021 comedy films
Films directed by Danis Tanović
Bosnia and Herzegovina comedy films
Bosnian-language films
Films set in Bosnia and Herzegovina